The 2005 All-Ireland Senior Football Championship Final was the 118th All-Ireland Final and the deciding match of the 2005 All-Ireland Senior Football Championship, an inter-county Gaelic football tournament for the top teams in Ireland.

Tyrone, captained by Brian Dooher, won their second title with a three-point win.	
	
In 2018, Martin Breheny listed this as the second greatest All-Ireland Senior Football Championship Final.

References

All-Ireland Senior Football Championship Final
All-Ireland Senior Football Championship Final
All-Ireland Senior Football Championship Final, 2005
All-Ireland Senior Football Championship Final
All-Ireland Senior Football Championship Finals
Kerry county football team matches
Tyrone county football team matches